Phacelia californica is a species of phacelia known by the common names California phacelia and California scorpionweed. It is native to coastal northern California and Oregon, where it grows in chaparral, woodland, and coastal bluffs and grassland.

It is roughly hairy in texture. The dense, hairy inflorescence is a one-sided curving or coiling cyme of many bell-shaped flowers.

This native wildflower is a food source for the Mission blue butterfly, an endangered species endemic to San Francisco.

References

External links
Jepson Manual Treatment
Photo gallery

californica
Flora of California
Flora of Oregon
Natural history of the California chaparral and woodlands
Natural history of the California Coast Ranges
Natural history of the San Francisco Bay Area
Butterfly food plants
Flora without expected TNC conservation status